Caribbean Integrated Financial Services Inc. (CarIFS) was a Barbados-based interbank network or ABM-network provider.  The company used the brand name CarIFS and offered customers of various financial institutions in Barbados 24-hour access to cash from their bank accounts via any affiliated Automated Banking Machine (ABM). The network was shutdown in 2020 and card transactions moved to the international VISA and Mastercard network.

 the Manager of CarIFS was David Robinson.

There was some criticism of the banks to end CarIFS as fees for customers and merchants increased with the move to the international networks.

Statistics
 the network linked over 104 automated banking machines and 35 hundred point of sale terminals throughout Barbados and recorded a total of 3.5 million transactions.

Banks with ABMs on CarIFS
Barbados National Bank (BNB)
Barbados Public Workers Co-Op Credit Union Ltd (BPWCCUL)
City of Bridgetown Co-op Credit Union Ltd. (COB)
FirstCaribbean International Bank (FCIB)
Royal Bank of Canada (RBC)
Scotiabank

References

External links
Official website
Prism Services Inc.

Banking in Barbados
Financial services companies of Barbados
Interbank networks